Dorian Harewood (born August 6, 1950) is an American actor, best known for playing Jesse Owens in The Jesse Owens Story (1984), Paul Strobber on Strike Force (1981–1982), and Rev. Morgan Hamilton in 7th Heaven (1996–2003).

Early years
Harewood was born on August 6, 1950 in Dayton, Ohio, the son of Emerson Macaulay and Estelle Olivia Harewood. His father was a high school teacher and post office clerk. Harewood has five siblings, Emerson M. Harewood Jr., Theolanda Harewood, Philip B. Harewood, Floranne E. Dunford and Lawanda G. Pitts. He graduated from the Conservatory of Music at the University of Cincinnati in 1972.

Career
Harewood got his start in musical theater. On Broadway, he performed in Two Gentlemen of Verona, Streamers, and The Mighty Gents. For his role in Don't Call Back, Harewood received a Theatre World Award for Most Promising Actor. While in a stage production with Bette Davis, she encouraged Harewood to continue acting in dramatic roles, and credits her as his mentor. He made his film debut in Foster and Laurie (1975).

Harewood portrayed Simon Haley (father of author Alex Haley) in the ABC miniseries Roots: The Next Generations. He is known for starring as Jesse Owens in The Jesse Owens Story, and for his co-starring role as police psychologist Paul Strobber in the ABC Television series Strike Force (starring Robert Stack). He appeared regularly on Trauma Center alongside Wendie Malick and Lou Ferrigno, had a recurring role on China Beach and was Hank Mitchell in The Trials of Rosie O'Neill.

Some of his film work includes disaster movie Gray Lady Down (1978), action drama Tank (1984), and sci-fi flick Solar Crisis (1990). In Against All Odds (1984), he appeared as a football player, and was Timothy Hutton (Sean Penn)'s alcoholic coworker in The Falcon and the Snowman (1985). Harewood then portrayed a combat veteran in Stanley Kubrick's Full Metal Jacket (1987). He appeared in two films in 2003: portraying Mackie Whitaker in Levity and Teddy Howard in Gothika.

In 1994, he was awarded the NAACP Image Award for Outstanding Actor in a Drama Series, Mini-Series or Television Movie, for his recurring role as jazz/blues saxophonist Clarence "Cool Papa" Charleston on the NBC drama series I'll Fly Away. The following year, Harewood voiced Hank Aaron in Hank Aaron: Chasing a Dream, narrating the television movie. He earned an Emmy Award nomination for the special.

He also played Dr. Julian Wilkes in the NBC (later syndicated) TV series Viper, and had a recurring role as Rev. Morgan Hamilton in 7th Heaven. Harewood appeared as Eliot Pierce in the Showtime series The Hoop Life. For his work on this series, Harewood received his second NAACP Image Award nomination, for Outstanding Supporting Actor in a Drama Series in 2000. He has also dabbled in music, having sung the national anthem at the 1994 Orange Bowl and releasing an album, Love Will Stop Calling, in 1988.

As a voice actor, Harewood began playing characters in animation during the 1980s. He voiced A.C. in The California Raisin Show, portrayed Riley in Batman: The Animated Series, gave voice to Tombstone in Spider-Man and voiced Michael Jordan in Saturday morning cartoon ProStars. He later returned to the Batman franchise as Jim Tate in Batman Beyond. When James Avery was unavailable, Harewood would voice Shredder on Teenage Mutant Ninja Turtles. Harewood played Rhodey Rhodes / War Machine in Iron Man and The Incredible Hulk. He provided the voice of Modo in Biker Mice from Mars (1993−96), a role which he reprised in the revival of the same name (2006−08).

Having appeared in over 100 productions in film and television, Harewood has only publicly expressed regret with one: the miniseries Beulah Land, where he portrayed an overseer named Floyd. He was disgusted with the film's script, and claimed he was "unhappy" and "embarrassed" with the finished production. Harewood has stated he will only accept roles he feels present positive images for African-Americans.

Personal life
Harewood married actress Nancy Ann McCurry on February 14, 1979. The couple have two children, Olivia Ruth and John Dorian.

Filmography

Films

Television

Video games

Radio
 Public service announcement for DJ Ra's Hip-Hop Literacy campaign, encouraging reading of books by Alex Haley.

Music
 "Show Me (One More Time)" (recorded in the 1980s)
 Love Will Stop Calling (1988) Emeric Records

References

External links
 
 
 

Living people
American male film actors
American male video game actors
American male voice actors
University of Cincinnati – College-Conservatory of Music alumni
Male actors from Dayton, Ohio
African-American male actors
American male television actors
20th-century African-American people
20th-century American male actors
21st-century African-American people
21st-century American male actors
1950 births